The Val-Test® Group is a Buying / Marketing Group for a collective of wholesalers, distributors, dealers and retailers in hardware, paint sundries, electrical, plumbing, housewares, marine, automotive and the decorative art industries.

Founded in 1962, Val-Test® developed over 300+ supplier programs, successfully recruited over 150+ members, created the industry’s most advanced EDI Central Billing System, sponsored the industry’s favorite shows, processed thousands of supplier proposals and managed world-class marketing programs serving over 22,000+ retailers and achieved sales in excess of $500 million per year. Today, Val-Test® continues to champion award-winning services for e-commerce marketing and works collaboratively in alliance with PRO Group designed to leverage both groups’ strengths to deliver superior value to the members they serve.

The Keen Kutter® trademark is owned by the Val-Test® Group of Illinois. After Val-Test® acquired the trademark, limited use authorization was developed for a premiere line of Keen Kutter® pocket-knives manufactured by Schrade Cutlery, Frost Cutlery and most recently Bear & Son Cutlery Co. to remain committed to the finest quality made in the U.S.A.

Competitors 
 PRO Group
 Distribution America

External links 
 www.valtest.group
Val-Test® website
  Val-Test to extend planograms. Home Channel News,  June 22, 1998
 Marketing groups seek new business Home Channel News,  June 21 1999
 National Retail Hardware Association: Hardlines Distribution

American companies established in 1962
Retail companies established in 1962
Retailers' cooperatives in the United States
Hardware stores of the United States
Schaumburg, Illinois
Companies based in Cook County, Illinois
1962 establishments in Illinois